This is a list of famous individual wolves, pairs of wolves, or wolf packs. For a list of wolf subspecies, see Subspecies of Canis lupus. For a list of all species in the Canidae family, several of which are named "wolves", see list of canids.

Individual wolves
Custer Wolf
Hexham wolf
Lobo the King of Currumpaw
Romeo
Slavc
Three Toes of Harding County
Tiger of Sabrodt
Wolf of Ansbach
OR-7 (also known as "Journey") [male]
302M (also known as "The Casanova")
926F (Spitfire) - daughter of O-Six
O-Six (also known as "The 06 Female" or 832F [her research ID])

In folklore and mythology
Amarok
Asena
Fenrir
Garmr (different sources call Garmr either a wolf or a dog)
Geri and Freki
Hati Hróðvitnisson
Lupa, the she-wolf that nursed Romulus and Remus
Sköll
Warg
Werewolf
Wepwawet
Raiju

Fictional wolves

Akela
Big Bad Wolf
Bigby Wolf
Gmork
Maugrim
Raksha
White Fang

See also
Wolf (disambiguation)
Wolves in fiction
Werewolf fiction
List of gray wolf populations by country

Wolves
 
wolves